Hydroxyacid oxidase (glycolate oxidase) 1 is a protein that in humans is encoded by the HAO1 gene.

Function

This gene is one of three related genes that have 2-hydroxyacid oxidase activity yet differ in encoded protein amino acid sequence, tissue expression and substrate preference. Subcellular location of the encoded protein is the peroxisome. Specifically, this gene is expressed primarily in liver and pancreas and the encoded protein is most active on glycolate, a two-carbon substrate. Glycolate oxidase oxidizes glycolic acid to glyoxylate, and can also oxidize glyoxylate into oxalate. These reactions are central to the toxicity of ethylene glycol poisoning.

The protein is also active on 2-hydroxy fatty acids. The transcript detected at high levels in pancreas may represent an alternatively spliced form or the use of a multiple near-consensus upstream polyadenylation site.

References

Further reading